Roman Kireyev (born 14 February 1987) is a former Kazakhstani road bicycle racer who rode for UCI ProTeam .

On 22 August 2011 Astana announced his retirement from cycling after he had struggled with a back injury. The timing of this announcement caused speculation that Kireyev was forced into retirement to make way for Andrey Kashechkin and Alexander Vinokourov to compete. Before Kireyev's retirement, Astana was afoul of the UCI's rules regarding the maximum number of riders employed by a team.

Major results
Source:

2004
 , Asian Junior Games, Road Race
 , Asian Junior Games, Ind. Time Trial
2005
 3rd, Giro della Toscana – U19 version
2006
  U23 Road Race Champion

References

External links

Kazakhstani male cyclists
1987 births
Living people
People from Petropavl